Luis Carlos Chía Bermúdez (born 8 February 1997 in Soacha) is a Colombian cyclist, who currently rides for amateur team Supergiros–ALC Manizales.

Major results
2015
 1st Stage 1 Vuelta a Colombia Juniors
2019
 1st Stage 5 Clásico RCN
 1st Stage 3 
2020
 1st Stage 1 
2021
 1st Stage 2 Vuelta a Colombia
 1st Stage 2 Vuelta al Tolima
 1st Stage 3 Clásica de Girardot
2022
 1st Stages 1 & 3 Vuelta a Colombia
 1st Stage 2 
 1st Stages 2 & 3 Clásica de Girardot

References

External links

1997 births
Living people
Colombian male cyclists
Vuelta a Colombia stage winners
People from Cundinamarca Department
21st-century Colombian people